Scibelli is an Italian surname. Notable people with the surname include:

 Anthony M. Scibelli (1911–1998), American politician
 Joe Scibelli (1939–1991), American football player

Italian-language surnames